Floyd County Productions is an American animation studio located in Atlanta, Georgia. It has produced the animated TV shows Archer, Unsupervised, Chozen, and Dicktown for FX, in addition to providing animation for various live-action shows.

The company was founded in 2009 by Adam Reed and Matt Thompson after they closed 70/30 Productions following the cancellation of the company's shows. Floyd County Productions grew from a small eight-person studio into a competitive animation house.

Productions

Television series

Feature Animation

Unaired productions
 Bigfoot (Not picked up)
 Cassius and Clay (Pilot episode produced but officially cancelled by FXX before first season started)
 Deadpool (Ended when Donald Glover, Stephen Glover, FX and Marvel Television parted ways)

Accolades

References 

American animation studios
Adult animation studios
Mass media companies established in 2009
2009 establishments in Georgia (U.S. state)
Companies based in Atlanta